E with breve (Э̆ э̆; italics: Э̆ э̆) in the letter of the Cyrillic script.

E with breve is used in the Tundra Nenets language, where it can denote the schwa .

See also
Cyrillic characters in Unicode

Cyrillic letters with diacritics
Letters with breve